Yu Liu is an American historian, and professor at Niagara County Community College.

He was graduated from Loyang Foreign Languages Institute, China, with a Bachelor of Arts; from Lancaster University with a Master of Arts; from Edinburgh University with a Master of Science; and from University at Buffalo, The State University of New York with a Ph.D.

Awards
2006 Guggenheim Fellow

Works
"The Importance of the Chinese Connection: The Origin of the English Garden", Eighteenth-Century Life, Volume 27, Number 3, Fall 2003, pp. 70–98
"Seeing God Differently: Chinese Piety and European Modernity", History of Religions, 45 no.1 (2005), pp. 29–44
"The Intricacies of Accommodation: The Proselytizing Strategy of Matteo Ricci", Journal of World History, December 2008, Encyclopædia Britannica
Seeds of a Different Eden: Chinese Gardening Ideas,  University of South Carolina Press. 2008, 
Poetics and Politics: The Revolutions of Wordsworth, P. Lang, 1999,

References

Chinese expatriates in the United States
Alumni of Lancaster University
Alumni of the University of Edinburgh
University at Buffalo alumni
State University of New York faculty
Living people
21st-century American historians
21st-century American male writers
Year of birth missing (living people)
American male non-fiction writers